Ferial can be

An alternative spelling of the Persian girls' name Faryal
Pertaining to a day in the calendar of ancient Rome when no work was done; see Glossary of ancient Roman religion#feria
Pertaining to Feria days - days in the calendar of the Catholic Church which are not dedicated to any holy person or event 
An annual festival held at the Teatro Aguascalientes in Mexico

Albanian feminine given names